Zhenru Temple is a Buddhist temple located in Putuo District of Shanghai, China. It is a Major National Historical and Cultural Site in Shanghai.

Name
The name "Zhenru"  means "thusness" or "reality as it is" in Chinese, and comes from the Buddhist sutra Vijnaptimatratasiddhi-sastra or Cheng Wei-Shih Lun in Chinese.

History

Song dynasty
In its first iteration, built in the Song dynasty (960–1276) it was called "Zhenru Yuan" originally, and changed to "Zhenru Si" by monk Yong'an in the Jiading era (1208–1224) of the Southern Song dynasty (1127–1276).

Yuan dynasty
In 1320, during the reign of Ayurbarwada Buyantu Khan in the Mongolian ruling Yuan dynasty (1271–1368), monk Miaoxin moved the temple to the present site.

Ming dynasty
Zhenru Temple has been repaired two times in the Ming dynasty (1368–1644), one in the Hongwu period (1368–1398) and the other in the Hongzhi period (1488–1505).

Qing dynasty
In 1860, in the reign of Xianfeng Emperor (1851–1861) of the Qing dynasty (1644–1911), the temple was devastated by the Taiping Rebellion.

People's Republic of China
In May 1959, it was authorized as a municipal cultural heritage building.

In 1966, Mao Zedong launched the Cultural Revolution. Statues and other works of art were either removed, damaged or destroyed by the Red Guards, including a Ming dynasty gilded copper statue of Maitreya and a Qing dynasty carved wood statue of Sakyamuni. 

In 1979, the Shanghai Municipal Government refurbished and redecorated the temple, and used it as an ancient architecture exhibition hall. 

In 1991, regular scripture lectures, meditation and other features of temple life were resumed. 

In January 1992, Singaporean Buddhist monk Xingren presented three jade statues of the Buddha and some Buddhist sutras to the temple. 

On November 20, 1996, it has been designated as a "Major National Historical and Cultural Site in Shanghai" by the State Council of China.

Architecture
The existing main buildings include the Shanmen, Four Heavenly Kings Hall, Mahavira Hall and Guanyin Hall.

Mahavira Hall
The Mahavira Hall was built in 1320 during the Yuan dynasty (1271–1368). A  and  jade statue of Sakyamuni sits in the center of the hall.

References

Buddhist temples in Shanghai
Major National Historical and Cultural Sites in Shanghai
14th-century establishments in China
14th-century Buddhist temples
Religious buildings and structures completed in 1320

External links
Zhenru Monastery, Architectura Sinica Site Archive